"Blue wall" is a term used by political pundits to refer to 18 U.S. states and the District of Columbia that the Democratic Party consistently won in presidential elections between 1992 and 2012. George W. Bush, the only Republican president elected during this time, was able to narrowly win the electoral college in 2000 and 2004 only by winning states outside of the blue wall.

During the 2016 presidential election, many political pundits speculated that the "blue wall" made Hillary Clinton a heavy favorite to win the electoral college. However, Republican nominee Donald Trump was able to achieve victories in the three blue wall states of Michigan, Pennsylvania and Wisconsin, as well as an electoral college vote from Maine, a fourth blue wall state. He was consequently elected president with 306 electoral college votes (excluding two faithless electors).

In the 2020 United States presidential election, Democratic nominee Joe Biden defeated President Trump by reclaiming Wisconsin, Michigan, and Pennsylvania for his party. Trump's lone breakthrough in the "blue wall" in 2020 was the one electoral vote from Maine, which he again won. Coincidentally, Biden won 306 electors, the same number Trump did in 2016.

The term "red wall", or "red sea", is less commonly used to refer to states that Republicans have consistently won in previous election cycles; however, most of these states represent significantly fewer electoral college votes than the blue wall. These terms refer to the colors that have become associated with the Democratic and Republican parties, respectively, in the 21st century.

Origin
Ronald Brownstein claims to have coined the term "blue wall" in 2009.
After the 2012 presidential election, Paul Steinhauser called "blue wall […] the cluster of eastern, Midwest and western states that have traditionally gone Democratic."  The earliest description of the forces creating the blue wall comes from a Houston Chronicle blogger, Chris Ladd. A Republican, Ladd wrote in November 2014 that the seemingly impressive Republican win in the 2014 mid-term elections had overshadowed another trend apparent in the results – a demographic and geographic collapse.

The blue wall referred to a perceived Democratic demographic lock on the Electoral College resulting from the Republican Party's narrowing focus on the interests of white, rural, and Southern voters. According to Ladd, the presence of the blue wall means "a minimally effective Democratic candidate" is all but assured of winning 257 electoral votes, just 13 short of the threshold needed to win the Electoral College and the presidency. Ladd's analysis became popular when MSNBC commentator Lawrence O'Donnell featured it on a post-election episode of his show The Last Word with Lawrence O'Donnell.

A similar "red wall/sea", behind which lie states solidly Republican, has also been posited to exist. But, having fewer electoral college votes, it would be theoretically easier for a Democratic presidential candidate to win without breaching it, as had been done in 2012.

States behind the blue wall
Behind this "blue wall" lay states, many carrying a relatively high number of electoral votes, which appeared to be solidly behind the Democratic Party, at least on the national level, and which a Republican presidential candidate appeared likely to have to write off, seeking a total of 270 electoral votes from other regions. States behind this wall lay generally in the Northeastern United States, and the West Coast of the United States, and included some of the Great Lakes states. In each of the 6 presidential election cycles prior to 2016, the Democratic Party had won 18 of these states (as well as the District of Columbia), totaling 238 of the necessary 270 votes need to win. The "big three" Democratic stronghold states include California, New York, and Illinois.

States falling behind this blue wall generally included those the Democrats had carried since the 1992 presidential election until the 2016 presidential election that included (in order of decreasing population and followed by current number of electoral votes): California (54), New York (28), Illinois (19), Pennsylvania (19), Michigan (15), New Jersey (14), Washington (12), Massachusetts (11), Maryland (10), Minnesota (10), Wisconsin (10), Oregon (8), Connecticut (7), Hawaii (4), Maine (4), Rhode Island (4), Delaware (3), and Vermont (3), as well as Washington, D.C. (3); this is a total of 238 votes. Had Al Gore won New Hampshire (4) in 2000 and if John Kerry had won both New Mexico (5), and Iowa (7), in 2004, all three of those states would also have become part of the blue wall states since 1992. The last time any of these states cast their votes for the Republican presidential candidate before 2016 was when George H. W. Bush defeated Michael Dukakis in 1988 and carried California, Illinois, Pennsylvania, Michigan, New Jersey, Maryland, Connecticut, Maine, Delaware, and Vermont. The last time any of New York, Washington, Massachusetts, Wisconsin, Oregon, Hawaii, and Rhode Island cast their votes for the Republican presidential candidate before 2016 was when Ronald Reagan was reelected in a landslide in 1984. One of these states, Minnesota, has not been carried by a Republican presidential candidate since 1972. The District of Columbia has voted for the Democratic candidate in every election since it was admitted to the electoral college for the 1964 election.

2016: Demise of the blue wall

The Democrats' "lock" on these states had been called into question between 2012 and 2016, as several had been competitive in recent elections, and many had Republicans currently holding elected statewide office, generally either senator or governor. Blue wall states with a Republican senator included Pennsylvania, Wisconsin, and Maine. Those with a Republican governor included Massachusetts, Maryland, and Vermont. In addition to these 18 states, three others, Iowa, New Mexico, and New Hampshire, had only voted for the Republican once in the same 6 election cycles, giving their votes to George W. Bush in either 2000 or 2004, whilst Oregon saw Bush lose by only 7,000 votes in 2000. If included in the total, the votes behind the blue wall numbered 257, just 13 short of what is needed to win. In 2016, the blue wall showed some cracks, and went down from 242 electoral votes to 195. Some in the mainstream media did, however, suspect the Democrats might lose Pennsylvania.

Nate Silver had criticized the idea of the blue wall, pointing to a similar "red wall/red sea" of states that voted Republican from 1968 to 1988. He argued that the blue wall simply represented a "pretty good run" in elections, and that relatively minor gains in the popular vote could flip some of its states to Republican. This was seen in the 2016 election, where voters from manufacturing states traditionally behind the blue wall voted for Donald Trump, providing him the victory in Pennsylvania, Wisconsin, Michigan, and Maine's 2nd congressional district. Others have also posited that the states of Michigan, Wisconsin, and Pennsylvania had never definitively been "safe" for the Democratic Party, citing the close margins in those states in the 2000 and 2004 presidential elections and opining that the outsized margins of victory secured by Barack Obama in the elections of 2008 and 2012 may have created a false impression of their safety for Democratic candidates.

2020: Resurgence of the blue wall 
During the 2020 United States presidential election, Democratic nominee Joe Biden won the states of Wisconsin, Michigan, and Pennsylvania. However, Biden carried these states only by 0.5–3 point margins, a considerable underperformance compared to Obama's margins in these states in 2008 and 2012. Long-term trends seem less favorable to Democrats in these states as they all voted to the right of the national average and many working-class white voters there have been moving towards the Republicans. 

Biden also broke into the red wall/sea by winning Arizona, Georgia, and the 2nd congressional district of Nebraska. However, Maine's 2nd congressional district voted for Donald Trump. In many ways, the blue wall has not died, but rather shifted in recent years from containing all the states that John Kerry won in 2004 (with the exception of New Hampshire), and instead replacing Wisconsin, Michigan, and Pennsylvania with New Mexico, Colorado, and Virginia. While they have only been carried by a Democratic nominee for four straight election cycles, Joe Biden won all three of those states by more than 10% in 2020, and the demographic changes in all three of those states continue to bolster the strength of Democrats there.

Red sea

The states which Republicans have won in the last eleven elections (from 1980 to 2020) are Texas (40), Alabama (9), South Carolina (9), Oklahoma (7), Mississippi (6), Utah (6), Kansas (6), Nebraska (4) (but not Nebraska's 2nd congressional district), Idaho (4), South Dakota (3), North Dakota (3), Alaska (3), and Wyoming (3), giving a total of 103 votes. Additionally, Tennessee (11), Missouri (10), Kentucky (8), Louisiana (8), Arkansas (6), West Virginia (4), and Montana (4) have been won by Republicans in the last six elections (from 2000 to 2020), making more recent additions to the red wall/sea, bringing the total electoral votes up to 154. Other states with a 10-out-of-11 (from 1980 to 2020) Republican record include North Carolina (16) and Indiana (11), whose 27 electoral votes added to the 154 of the preceding twenty red sea states make for a total of 181 electoral votes, although North Carolina is usually a swing state that leans slightly towards Republicans, enough to prevent Democrats from winning it except in blowout years for them. 

Former red wall/sea states include Georgia and Arizona, which had been won by the Republicans in 8 of the 9 elections from 1984 to 2016, but were won by the Democrats in 2020 and are now considered swing states; Texas, which has been won by the Republicans for the last 11 presidential elections and is included in the above list of red wall/sea states, is also now sometimes considered a swing state as it was won by the Republicans by only 5.6% in 2020, and polls there had shown a close race.

In presidential elections
Presidential votes in blue wall states since 1876:

 Key

Bold denotes candidates elected as president

See also
Bible Belt
Jesusland map
Political culture of the United States
Red states and blue states
Rust Belt
Sixth Party System
Swing state
Left Coast
Solid South
Sun Belt
Red wall (British politics)

Notes

References

External links
 The Detroit News: Mich. GOP eyes plan for cracking 'blue wall'

Political terminology of the United States
Presidential elections in the United States
Electoral geography of the United States
Psephology